The West 30th Street Heliport  is a heliport on the west side of Manhattan in New York City. The original heliport opened with two landing pads on September 26, 1956, and that December New York Airways began scheduled passenger flights, the first airline flights to Manhattan. It is owned by the Hudson River Park Trust and operated by Abigail Trenk and Brian Tolbert.

Operations
KJRA has one published Instrument Procedures: COPTER RNAV (GPS) 210. Boating traffic in the Hudson River requires care in the approach to the heliport's landing pad.

Tourist flights out of the 30th Street Heliport were scheduled to move to Downtown Manhattan Heliport on March 31, 2010, and the heliport itself was scheduled to relocate by December 31, 2012, as a result of a court agreement between helicopter operators and Friends of Hudson River Park, who took action to enforce the Hudson River Park Act, which banned tourism flights from that location. However, this agreement was voided by state legislation in 2013, and the heliport remains open.

Airlines

Charter

Statistics 
Of the flights, 73% are air taxi, 16% general aviation, 10% commercial, and less than 1% military.

Accidents and incidents 

On June 25, 1968, a Brantly 305 on a sightseeing flight crashed into the Hudson River shortly after takeoff from the West 30th Street Heliport. The pilot and all five passengers were rescued.
On December 31, 1997, an Aérospatiale AS-355 returning from a sightseeing flight crashed into a building at the West 30th Street Heliport.  Eight people were injured in the accident.
 On July 7, 2007, a Eurocopter EC130 B4 returning to the West 30th Street Heliport from a sightseeing flight had an engine malfunction and made a controlled landing in the Hudson River, deploying its emergency pontoons. The pilot and seven passengers were rescued from private boats.
On August 8, 2009, nine people were killed when a Liberty Helicopters sightseeing helicopter collided with a private plane shortly after takeoff from the West 30th Street Heliport. Both aircraft were operating on visual flight rules.

See also 
Downtown Manhattan Heliport
East 34th Street Heliport
Aviation in the New York metropolitan area

References

External links

Airports in New York City
Transportation buildings and structures in Manhattan
Heliports in New York (state)
1956 establishments in New York City
West Side Highway